Dreams Come True or Dream Come True may refer to:

Organizations
 Dreams Come True (British charity)
 Dreams Come True (American non-profit)

Film and television
 Dreams Come True (film), a 1936 British musical film
 ""Dreams Come True" (Glee), the final episode of TV series Glee

Music
 Dreams Come True (band), a Japanese pop group

Albums
 Dream Come True (A Flock of Seagulls album), 1985
 Dreams Come True (Andrew Hill & Chico Hamilton album), 2008
 Dreams Come True (CANT album), 2011
 Dream Come True (Earl Klugh album), 1980
 Dreams Come True (Judee Sill album), 2005
 Dreams Come True, a 2012 EP by Heidi Montag
 Dream Come True (Nora Aunor and Tirso Cruz III album), 1971
 Dreams Come True, a 2006 album by Rosemary Vandenbroucke
Dreams Come True 2019, a 2019 remix EP by Black Dresses

Songs 
 "Dreams Come True" (Hey! Say! JUMP song), 2008
 "Dreams Come True (S.E.S. song)", 1998, overed by Aespa in 2021
 "Dreams Come True", a song by Brandon Flowers from The Desired Effect
 "Dream Come True", a song by Frozen Ghost from Nice Place to Visit
 "Dreams Come True", a song by HammerFall from Crimson Thunder
 "Dreams Come True", a song by Robert Palmer from Honey
 "Dream Come True", a song by Ta-Gana from the soundtrack of the 1998 film The Parent Trap
 "Dream Come True", a song by The Brand New Heavies from The Brand New Heavies
 "Dreams Come True", a song by Westlife from Coast to Coast
 "Dreams Come True", a song by Willie Nelson from It Always Will Be

See also
Never Had a Dream Come True (disambiguation)